In Japanese cuisine, a , also known a sushi oke, is a round, flat-bottomed wooden tub or barrel used in the final steps of preparing rice for sushi. Traditional hangiri are made from cypress wood bound with two copper bands.

A shamoji wooden paddle is used with a hangiri to dress and to cool the rice. After cooking, the rice is transferred to the hangiri where it is tossed with a dressing made of rice vinegar, sugar, and salt. When the mixing is complete, it is covered with a  cloth and allowed to cool.

A typical hangiri may cost two or three times as much as an expensive steel cooking pot.

References

Japanese food preparation utensils
Sushi